Mariana Zaharia (born 4 September 1957) is a Romanian rower. She competed in the women's quadruple sculls event at the 1980 Summer Olympics.

References

1957 births
Living people
Romanian female rowers
Olympic rowers of Romania
Rowers at the 1980 Summer Olympics
Place of birth missing (living people)